Some Order, Long Understood is an album by American keyboardist and composer Wayne Horvitz recorded in 1982 and released on the Italian Black Saint label.

Reception
The AllMusic review awarded the album 3 stars.

Track listing
All compositions by Wayne Horvitz
 "Psalm" - 21:08 
 "Some Order, Long Understood" - 21:20 
Recorded at Studio Henry in New York City on February 5, 1982

Personnel
Wayne Horvitz - piano
Butch Morris - cornet
William Parker - bass

References

Black Saint/Soul Note albums
Wayne Horvitz albums
1983 albums